"Signal" (stylized in all caps) is a song recorded by South Korean girl group Twice. The song was released on May 15, 2017, by JYP Entertainment and distributed by KT Music, as the lead single from their fourth extended play of the same name.

The Japanese version of "Signal", along with its accompanying short version of the music video, was released on June 14, 2017, as a promotional single for their first Japanese compilation album, #Twice.

The song received its first awards, Song of the Year (grand prize) and Best Dance Performance for a female group, at the 2017 Mnet Asian Music Awards.

Background and release
On May 1, 2017, JYP Entertainment announced Twice's comeback with their fourth EP Signal and its title track of the same name. The first music video teaser of "Signal" was uploaded online on May 13. It was released on the 15th as a digital download on various music sites.

Composition

"Signal" was written by Park Jin-young and co-composed by Park and Kairos. This marked Twice's first collaboration with their agency's founder. The electropop song features a programmed Roland TR-808-style kick and hi-hat with incorporating hip hop elements. Lyrically, it expresses a girl's frustration who keeps sending "signs and signal" to hint her feelings for a guy but is unnoticed.

Music video
The music video for "Signal" was directed by Naive Creative Production, the same team behind Twice's previous music videos. It surpassed 100 million views on YouTube on August 30, 2017, three months after the release. On December 7, it was announced that it ranked second place on YouTube's Most Popular Music Video in Korea of that year, only behind the top spot of "Knock Knock". It also ranked at No. 9 on 2017 YouTube's Top Trend Music Video in Japan.

It has a science fiction-fantasy theme featuring a green-headed alien and the nine members of Twice with their own superpowers: Nayeon's superpower is time reversing, Jeongyeon's is time freezing, Momo's is super speed, Sana's is invisibility, Jihyo's is x-ray vision, Mina's is hypnosis, Dahyun's is self-duplication, Chaeyoung's is telekinesis, and Tzuyu's is super strength. The cameraman who made an appearance in "Cheer Up" music video is also seen. At the end, the members transform into aliens.

Commercial performance
"Signal" debuted at number 1 for two consecutive weeks and 4 on Gaon's Digital Chart and Billboard Japan Hot 100, respectively. It charted at number 1, 3 and 22 on Kpop Hot 100, Billboard charts' World Digital Song Sales and (Philippine Hot 100) respectively.

Japanese version
On February 24, 2017, Twice officially announced that their debut in Japan was set for June 28. They released a compilation album titled #Twice which consists of ten songs including both Korean and Japanese-language versions of "Signal". The Japanese lyrics were written by Yu Shimoji and Samuelle Soung. "Signal (Japanese ver.)", along with its accompanying short version of the music video, was pre-released on June 14 as a promotional single of the album.

Charts

Weekly charts

Year-end charts

Certifications

|-

Accolades

Music program awards

See also
List of Gaon Digital Chart number ones of 2017
List of Kpop Hot 100 number ones

References

2017 singles
2017 songs
Korean-language songs
Twice (group) songs
JYP Entertainment singles
Gaon Digital Chart number-one singles
Songs about extraterrestrial life
Billboard Korea K-Pop number-one singles
Songs written by Park Jin-young